Casselberry is a city in Seminole County, Florida, United States. The population was 26,241 at the 2010 census. The city is part of the Orlando–Kissimmee–Sanford Metropolitan Statistical Area.

Geography

Casselberry features over 30 lakes and ponds, the largest being Lake Howell, the Triplet Chain of Lakes, Lake Kathryn, and Lake Concord.

History

Prior to European settlement in the 19th-century Native American groups inhabited the Seminole County area, including land in present-day Casselberry.

Casselberry was originally part of unincorporated Fern Park. Residents decided to incorporate Casselberry as a tax-free town in 1940, with the purpose of avoiding property taxes. The town was reincorporated as a city in 1965, and property taxes were reinstated in 1976.

Demographics

At the 2010 U.S. Census, there were 26,241 people, 11,430 households, and 6,398 families residing in the city. The population density was 3,751.9 inhabitants per square mile (1,448.6/km). There were 12,708 housing units. The racial makeup of the city was 80.1% White, 8.0% African American, 0.4% Native American, 2.9% Asian, 0.1% Pacific Islander, 4.9% from other races, and 3.5% from two or more races. Hispanic or Latino of any race were 22.6% of the population.

There were 11,430 households, out of which 23.1% had children under the age of 18 living with them, 35.8% were married couples living together, 14.8% had a female householder with no husband present, and 44.0% were non-families. 32.5% of all households were made up of individuals, and 10.1% had someone living alone who was 65 years of age or older. The average household size was 2.29 and the average family size was 2.92.

The median income for a household in the city was $44,807, and the median income for a family was $51,371. The per capita income for the city was $24,184. About 14.7% of the population were below the poverty line.

Education

Elementary
 Sterling Park Elementary
 Red Bug Elementary
 Casselberry Elementary

Middle
 South Seminole Academy of Leadership, Law & Advanced Studies

Private schools

Parks and recreation

The City of Casselberry maintains 17 parks ranging from small neighborhood parks to large centers for recreation. Some of these parks include:  

 Branch Tree Park
 Crystal Bowl Park
 Dew Drop Park
 Forest Brook Park
 Lake Concord Park (also includes the Casselberry Art House)
 Lake Hodge Park
 Lancelot Park
 Pawmosa Dog Park
 Plumosa Oaks Park
 Red Bug Lake Park
 Rotary Park
 Secret Lake Park
 Sunnytown Park
 Sunset Park
 Veterans Memorial Park
 Wirz Park
 Wirz Trail

The City of Casselberry's recently adopted (2017) Parks Master Plan calls for the development of a skatepark. The development of a community skatepark has been advocated for by citizens of the city for over two years through a grassroots campaign.

Sports
Seminole Speedway was located in Casselberry, operating between 1945 and 1954, and hosting stock car, Modified, and motorcycle racing.

Notable people

 Jimmy Boyle, record producer and musician
 Nick Calathes, basketball player for the Memphis Grizzlies and Greek club Panathinaikos
 Pat Calathes (born 1985), basketball player for the Israeli club Maccabi Haifa and Greek club Panathinaikos
 Hedy Lamarr, Austrian-born actress and inventor
 Robert James Miller, Medal of Honor recipient buried at All Faiths Memorial Park
 Chandler Parsons, basketball player for the Atlanta Hawks
 Kirsten Storms, actress, lived in Casselberry during her childhood
 Dahvie Vanity, singer and former vocalist of Blood on the Dance Floor

References

External links
 Casselberry Economic Development
 City of Casselberry

Cities in Seminole County, Florida
Greater Orlando
1940 establishments in Florida
Cities in Florida